Fürstenberg-Wolfach was a county in western Baden-Württemberg, Germany during the Middle Ages. It occupied a region surrounding Wolfach. It was created as a partition of the County of Fürstenberg in 1408. With the extinction of its line of the Fürstenbergers in 1490, it was inherited by the Counts of Fürstenberg-Baar.

Counts of Fürstenberg-Wolfach (1408–1490)
Conrad IV (1408–1419)
Henry VIII the Noble (1419–1490)

Fürstenberg (princely family)
Counties of the Holy Roman Empire
States and territories established in 1408